Stories They Tell is the seventh album by American singer/songwriter Owen Temple. It was released on September 24, 2013 on El Paisano Records.

Track listing
All songs written by Owen Temple, except where noted.

"Looking For Signs" – 3:15 
"Make Something" – 4:03 
"Big Man" – 3:10 
"Cities Made of Gold" (Temple, Clay McClinton) – 3:39 
"Cracking the Code" (Temple, Gordy Quist) – 3:35
"Man For All Seasons" – 3:38
"Be There Soon" (Temple, Paul Cauthen, David Beck) – 2:47 
"Homegrown" (Temple, McClinton) – 3:21
"Johnson Grass" (Temple, Adam Carroll, A.J. Roach) – 4:13
"Stories They Tell" – 2:48 
"Six Nations Caledonia" (Temple, Quist) – 3:06

Personnel 

Musicians
 Owen Temple – vocals, acoustic guitar 
 Josh Flowers – bass
 Gabriel Rhodes – acoustic and baritone guitar, mandolin, organ, accordion
 Rick Richards – drums, percussion
 Tommy Spurlock – pedal steel guitar
 Colin Brooks – harmony vocals
 Jamie Wilson – harmony vocals

Additional personnel
 Gabriel Rhodes – production, engineering
 Lance Schriner – art direction, design
 Todd V. Wolfson – photography

Release history

References

External links 
Owen Temple website

Owen Temple albums
2013 albums